The Vintage Tour was Dolly Parton's 2005 concert tour to promote the release of her covers album, Those Were the Days. The tour kicked off on August 16 in Atlantic City, New Jersey and ran until December 16 in North Myrtle Beach, South Carolina.

History
It surprised many fans when, towards the end of 2005, Parton announced that she had put together a brand new stage show in support of her new  album Those Were the Days, which would be released mid-tour. She had previously stated in late 2004 that she'd let her band go and instead of touring, she was focusing on writing the score to the 9 to 5 musical.  But now she said:
"Well, I'm at it again. I'm very excited about the new Vintage Tour. I will be featuring vintage songs of my own (the songs I'm most known for) in addition to many of your old favorites from the past that I have recorded for a new album that is due out in the early fall. It's going to be lots of fun and bring back lots of memories, so come on out and be a part of it."

The October 2, 2005, Vintage show in San Francisco's Golden Gate Park was part of the free Hardly Strictly Bluegrass festival. The San Francisco Chronicle reported afterwards that an estimated 200,000 people had attended Dolly's performance.

Set list
The following set list is representative of the August 16, 2005 show in Atlantic City, New Jersey . It is not representative of all concerts for the duration of the tour.
"Those Were the Days"
"9 to 5"
"Jolene"
"Crimson and Clover"
"Me and Bobby McGee"
"My Tennessee Mountain Home"
"Coat of Many Colors"
"Smoky Mountain Memories"
"Marry Me" / "Applejack"
"Little Sparrow"
"Here You Come Again"
"Two Doors Down"
"PMS Blues"
"If I Were a Carpenter"
"Turn, Turn, Turn"
"Blowin' in the Wind"
"Imagine"
"I Will Always Love You"

Encore
 "Hello God" / "He's Alive"

Notes:
"Where Do the Children Play?", "Where Have All the Flowers Gone?", "These Old Bones", and "Hard Candy Christmas" were performed on select dates.

Tour dates

Cancelled shows

Personnel

The Mighty Fine Band
Band Leader, Guitar: Kent Wells
Drums: Steve Turner
Piano: Paul Hollowell
Fiddle: Jay Weaver
Dobro, Guitar: Richie Owens
Banjo: Bruce Watkins
Keyboard: Michael Davis
Background vocals: Jennifer O'Brien, Vicki Hampton & Richard Dennison

Other staff
Dolly Parton's Personal Tour Manager: Don Warden
Tour Manager: Dave Fowler
Production Assistant: Maryjo Spillane
Director, Staging & Choreography: Steve Summers
Stage Manager & Security: Danny Nozzell
Merchandising: Ira Parker

Notes

References

External links
Parton's Official Website
Dollymania tour page

Dolly Parton concert tours
2005 concert tours